Revulsion is a sudden violent feeling of disgust.

Revulsion (Star Trek: Voyager), an episode of Star Trek: Voyager.
Requiems of Revulsion, a 2001 music album.